The Namco System 246 is a development of the Sony PlayStation 2 technology as a basis for an arcade system board. It was released in December 2000 on its first game Bloody Roar 3. Like the Sega NAOMI, it is widely licensed for use by other manufacturers. Games such as Battle Gear 3  and Capcom Fighting Evolution are examples of System 246-based arcade games that are not Namco products.

Specifications

 Main CPU: MIPS III R5900-based "Emotion Engine", 64-bit RISC operating at 294.912 MHz (Overclocking to 299 MHz on System 256), with 128-bit SIMD capabilities
 Sub CPU: MIPS II R3000A IOP with cache at 33.8688 MHz (Unlike the PSXCPU)
 System memory: 32 MB RIMM 3200 32-bit dual-channel (2x 16-bit) RDRAM (Direct Rambus DRAM) @ 400 MHz, 3.2 GB/s peak bandwidth
 Graphics: "Graphics Synthesizer" operating at 147.456 MHz
 Graphics memory: 4MB eDRAM (8MB on System 256)
 Sound: "SPU1+SPU2"
 Media: CD-ROM, DVD-ROM, Hard Disk Drive, 64 MBit 3.3V NAND FlashROM Security Dongle

Namco System 256 is an upgraded version of System 246, but the upgrades are unknown (more VRAM and faster CPU speeds likely).

Namco Super System 256 is the same as regular Namco System 256 but it has the gun board integrated, though this variant was only used in Time Crisis 4.

Namco System 147 is similar to 246 but does not use a DVD-ROM drive, instead it has ROM chips on the system board.

List of System 246 / System 256 / System Super 256 / System 147 games

Released
 Battle Gear 3 (Taito, 2002)
 Battle Gear 3 Tuned (Taito, 2003)
 Bloody Roar 3 (Namco / 8ing / Raizing, 2000)
 Capcom Fighting Evolution (Capcom, 2004)
 Chou Dragon Ball Z (Banpresto, 2005)
 Cobra: The Arcade (Namco, 2005)
 Dragon Chronicles - Legend of The Master Ark (Namco, 2003)
 Dragon Chronicles Online (Namco, 2004)
 Druaga Online - The Story of Aon (Namco, 2006)
 Fate/Unlimited Codes (Capcom / Type-Moon / Cavia / 8ing, 2008)
 Getchu Play! Tottoko Hamutaro (Banpresto, 2007)
 Gundam Seed: Rengou vs. Z.A.F.T. (Capcom / Banpresto, 2005)
 Kinnikuman Muscle Grand Prix (Banpresto, 2006)
 Kinnikuman Muscle Grand Prix 2 (Banpresto, 2007)
 Minnade Kitaeru Zennou Training (Namco, 2006)
 Mobile Suit Gundam: Gundam vs. Gundam (Banpresto, 2008)
 Mobile Suit Gundam: Gundam vs. Gundam Next (Banpresto, 2009)
 Mobile Suit Gundam Seed Destiny: Rengou vs. Z.A.F.T. II (Banpresto, 2006)
 Mobile Suit Gundam Z: AEUG Vs. Titans (Capcom / Banpresto, 2003)
 Mobile Suit Gundam Z: AEUG Vs. Titans DX' (Capcom / Banpresto, 2004)
 MotoGP (Banpresto, 2007)
 Netchuu Pro Yakyuu 2002 (Namco, 2002)
 Pac-Man Battle Royale (Namco, 2011)
 PrideGP Grand Prix 2003 (Capcom, 2003)
 Quiz and Variety Sukusuku Inufuku 2 (Video System Co., 2004)
 Quiz and Variety Sukusuku Inufuku 2: Motto Sukusuku (Namco / AMI / Hamster, 2007)
 Quiz Mobile Suit Gundam: Tou. Senshi (Banpresto, 2006)
 Ridge Racer V: Arcade Battle (Namco, 2001)
 Sengoku Basara X Cross (Capcom / ARC System Works, 2008)
 Smash Court Tennis Pro Tournament (Namco, 2001)
 Soulcalibur II (Namco, 2002)
 Soulcalibur II Ver.D (Namco, 2003)
 Soulcalibur III Arcade Edition (Namco, 2006)
 Taiko No Tatsujin 7 (Namco, 2005)
 Taiko No Tatsujin 8 (Namco, 2006)
 Taiko No Tatsujin 9 (Namco, 2006)
 Taiko No Tatsujin 10 (Namco, 2007)
 Taiko No Tatsujin 11 (Namco, 2008)
 Taiko No Tatsujin 11 - Asian Version (Namco, 2008)
 Taiko No Tatsujin 12 (Namco, 2008)
 Taiko No Tatsujin 12 - Asian Version (Namco, 2009)
 Taiko No Tatsujin 12 - Extra Version (Namco, 2009)
 Taiko No Tatsujin 13 (Namco, 2009)
 Taiko No Tatsujin 14 (Namco, 2010)
 Technic Beat (Arika, 2002)
 Tekken 4 (Namco, 2001)
 Tekken 5 (Namco, 2004)
 Tekken 5.1 (Namco, 2005)
 Tekken 5: Dark Resurrection (Namco, 2005)
 The Battle of YuYu Hakusho (Banpresto, 2006)
 The Idolmaster (Namco, 2005)
 Time Crisis 3 (Namco, 2003)
 Time Crisis 4 (Namco, 2006)
 Vampire Night (Namco / Sega / WOW Entertainment, 2001)
 Wangan Midnight (Namco, 2001)
 Wangan Midnight R (Namco, 2002)
 Zoids Infinity (Taito, 2004)
 Zoids Infinity EX (Taito, 2005)
 Zoids Infinity EX Plus (Taito, 2006)

Unreleased
 Alien Sniper (Namco, 2002)
 Capcom Fighting All-Stars  (Capcom, 2003)
 Samurai Surf X (Namco, 2002)
 Starblade: Operation Blue Planet''  (Namco, 2002)

References

MIPS architecture
Namco arcade system boards
PlayStation 2